The 1985 Junior League World Series took place from August 12–17 in Taylor, Michigan, United States. Tampa, Florida defeated Salisbury, Maryland in the championship game.

This year featured the debut of the Host Team.

Teams

Results

References

Junior League World Series
Junior League World Series
Junior